Prost is a small chain of German beer bars in the United States. Prost is owned by Dan Hart and Chris Navarra.

Locations

As of 2021, the business operates in Seattle; Portland, Oregon; Boise, Idaho; and Bend, Oregon. 

The beer bar in north Portland is located on Mississippi Avenue in the Boise neighborhood. Stammtish has been described as a "sister restaurant" of the Portland location. The menu includes "traditional German dishes centered on the staples of bratwurst, sauerkraut, pickles, and German rye", as well as braunschweiger, Bavarian pretzel, and wurst.

Reception
In 2018, Pete Cottell of Thrillist included Prost in "The Beer Drinker's Ultimate Guide to Portland", writing: "Prost is a world-class German beer-lovers bar, and they've got the glassware, accoutrements, and beer selection to prove it. Lagers steeped in old-world tradition are the go-to for a sunny day on the back deck, but don't sleep on some of the Bavarian oddities that never hit it big with macro brewers. We humbly suggest a smoky rauchbier, a clean and crisp helles, or the subtly sweet tinge of a bananaweizen." The website's Emma Banks and Bradley Foster also included the restaurant in a 2022 list of "The Absolute Best Sports Bars in Seattle".

See also
 Beer in Germany
 List of German restaurants
 Prost Marketplace

References

External links

 

Boise, Portland, Oregon
Restaurants in Bend, Oregon
Culture of Boise, Idaho
German restaurants in Oregon
German restaurants in Portland, Oregon
German restaurants in Seattle
German restaurants in the United States
German-American culture in Idaho
North Portland, Oregon
Restaurants in Idaho